The Red Viper is a 1919 American silent film drama. It is anti-Communist themed and was produced during the red scare.

Plot

Production 
The film's director and producer was Jacques Tyrol, the writer was Winifred Dunn, and the cinematographer was Edward Wynard.

The film was produced by Tyrad Pictures, Inc. The film was distributed by Tyrad Pictures, Inc. and State Rights.

The film was released on September 7, 1919.

The film was an anti-communist film, made during the First Red Scare.

The film has an entry in the Library of Congress, along with being listed as a lost film.

Cast 

 Gareth Hughes as David Belkov
 Ruth Stonehouse as Mary Hogan
Jack Gilbert as Dick Grant
 Irma Harrison as Yolanda Kosloff
 R. H. Fitzsimmons as Charles Smith
 Alberta Lee as Mrs. Hogan
 Alfred Hollingsworth as Pat Hogan

References 

1919 films
1919 drama films
1910s American films
Silent American drama films